Robert Salman (died by 1444) was a farmer and landowner in Calne, Wiltshire. He was the member of Parliament for Malmesbury for the parliament of 1399 and for Calne for multiple parliaments from 1399 to 1417. Salman and his wife were members of the John St. Lo parish church in Calne.

References 

Members of the Parliament of England for Malmesbury
English MPs 1399
Year of birth unknown
Year of death unknown
Members of the Parliament of England (pre-1707) for Calne
15th-century English farmers
15th-century English landowners
English foresters
English MPs May 1413
English MPs April 1414
English MPs November 1414
English MPs 1417